Tha Alkaholiks, also known as Tha Liks, is an American hip hop trio from Los Angeles, California, United States. Since the early 1990s they have produced party music with a hardcore hip hop edge, powered by the beats of DJ and producer E-Swift (born Eric Brooks in Columbus, Georgia, raised in Toledo, Ohio) and the rhymes of J-Ro (born James Robinson in Los Angeles) and Tash (born Rico Smith in Cincinnati). Though commercial crossover success largely eluded the group, they maintained a dedicated following on their native West Coast, throughout the United States and worldwide. 3 songs of Tha Alkaholiks were also featured on Loud Rocks.

Discography

Albums

Singles

Videography
 Beer Goggles (2006)

References

External links
 

MNRK Music Group artists
Musical groups disestablished in 2006
Musical groups established in 1992
Musical groups from Los Angeles
Hip hop groups from California
American musical trios
Likwit Crew members